This is a list of the bird species recorded in Algeria. The avifauna of Algeria includes a total of 435 species.

This list's taxonomic treatment (designation and sequence of orders, families and species) and nomenclature (common and scientific names) follow the conventions of The Clements Checklist of Birds of the World, 2022 edition. The family accounts at the beginning of each heading reflect this taxonomy, as do the species counts found in each family account. Introduced and accidental species are included in the total counts for Algeria.

The following tags have been used to highlight several categories. The commonly occurring native species do not fall into any of these categories.

 (A) Accidental - a species that rarely or accidentally occurs in Algeria
 (E) Endemic - a species endemic to Algeria
 (I) Introduced - a species introduced to Algeria as a consequence, direct or indirect, of human actions
 (Ex) Extirpated - a species that no longer occurs in Algeria although populations exist elsewhere

Ostriches

Order: StruthioniformesFamily: Struthionidae

The ostrich is a flightless bird native to Africa. It is the largest living species of bird. It is distinctive in its appearance, with a long neck and legs and the ability to run at high speeds.

Common ostrich, Struthio camelus

Ducks, geese, and waterfowl

Order: AnseriformesFamily: Anatidae

Anatidae includes the ducks and most duck-like waterfowl, such as geese and swans. These birds are adapted to an aquatic existence with webbed feet, flattened bills, and feathers that are excellent at shedding water due to an oily coating.

Graylag goose, Anser anser
Greater white-fronted goose, Anser albifrons (A)
Lesser white-fronted goose, Anser erythropus (A)
Taiga bean-goose, Anser fabalis (A)
Brant, Branta bernicla
Barnacle goose, Branta leucopsis (A)
Red-breasted goose, Branta ruficollis (A)
Mute swan, Cygnus olor
Tundra swan, Cygnus columbianus
Whooper swan, Cygnus cygnus
Egyptian goose, Alopochen aegyptiacus (A)
Ruddy shelduck, Tadorna ferruginea
Common shelduck, Tadorna tadorna
Garganey, Spatula querquedula
Blue-winged teal, Spatula discors (A)
Northern shoveler, Spatula clypeata
Gadwall, Mareca strepera
Eurasian wigeon,  Mareca penelope
Mallard, Anas platyrhynchos
Northern pintail, Anas acuta
Green-winged teal, Anas crecca
Marbled teal, Marmaronetta angustirostris
Red-crested pochard, Netta rufina (Ex)
Common pochard, Aythya ferina
Ring-necked duck, Aythya collaris (A)
Ferruginous duck, Aythya nyroca
Tufted duck, Aythya fuligula
Greater scaup, Aythya marila
Lesser scaup, Aythya affinis (A)
Velvet scoter, Melanitta fusca
Common scoter, Melanitta nigra (A)
Common goldeneye, Bucephala clangula (A)
Smew, Mergellus albellus (A)
Common merganser, Mergus merganser
Red-breasted merganser, Mergus serrator
Ruddy duck, Oxyura jamaicensis (I)
White-headed duck, Oxyura leucocephala

Pheasants, grouse, and allies

Order: GalliformesFamily: Phasianidae

The Phasianidae are a family of terrestrial birds which consists of quails, partridges, snowcocks, francolins, spurfowls, tragopans, monals, pheasants, peafowls and jungle fowls. In general, they are plump (although they vary in size) and have broad, relatively short wings.

Ring-necked pheasant, Phasianus colchicus (I)
Common quail, Coturnix coturnix
Barbary partridge, Alectoris barbara
Red-legged partridge, Alectoris rufa (I)

Flamingos

Order: PhoenicopteriformesFamily: Phoenicopteridae

Flamingos filter-feed on shellfish and algae. Their oddly shaped beaks are specially adapted to separate mud and silt from the food they consume and, uniquely, are used upside-down.

Greater flamingo, Phoenicopterus roseus
Lesser flamingo, Phoenicopterus minor (A)

Grebes

Order: PodicipediformesFamily: Podicipedidae

Grebes are small to medium-large freshwater diving birds. They have lobed toes and are excellent swimmers and divers. However, they have their feet placed far back on the body, making them quite ungainly on land.

Little grebe, Tachybaptus ruficollis
Horned grebe, Podiceps auritus
Red-necked grebe, Podiceps grisegena (A)
Great crested grebe, Podiceps cristatus
Eared grebe, Podiceps nigricollis

Pigeons and doves

Order: ColumbiformesFamily: Columbidae

Pigeons and doves are stout-bodied birds with short necks and short slender bills with a fleshy cere.

Rock pigeon, Columba livia
Stock dove, Columba oenas
Common wood-pigeon, Columba palumbus
European turtle-dove, Streptopelia turtur
Eurasian collared-dove, Streptopelia decaocto (I)
Laughing dove, Streptopelia senegalensis
Namaqua dove, Oena capensis

Sandgrouse

Order: PterocliformesFamily: Pteroclidae

Sandgrouse have small, pigeon like heads and necks, but sturdy compact bodies. They have long pointed wings and sometimes tails and a fast direct flight. Flocks fly to watering holes at dawn and dusk. Their legs are feathered down to the toes.

Pin-tailed sandgrouse, Pterocles alchata
Chestnut-bellied sandgrouse, Pterocles exustus (A)
Spotted sandgrouse, Pterocles senegallus
Black-bellied sandgrouse, Pterocles orientalis
Crowned sandgrouse, Pterocles coronatus
Lichtenstein's sandgrouse, Pterocles lichtensteinii

Bustards

Order: OtidiformesFamily: Otididae

Bustards are large terrestrial birds mainly associated with dry open country and steppes in the Old World. They are omnivorous and nest on the ground. They walk steadily on strong legs and big toes, pecking for food as they go. They have long broad wings with "fingered" wingtips and striking patterns in flight. Many have interesting mating displays.

Great bustard, Otis tarda (Ex)
Arabian bustard, 
Houbara bustard, Chlamydotis undulata
Little bustard, Tetrax tetrax (Ex)

Cuckoos

Order: CuculiformesFamily: Cuculidae

The family Cuculidae includes cuckoos, roadrunners and anis. These birds are of variable size with slender bodies, long tails and strong legs.

Great spotted cuckoo, Clamator glandarius
Pied cuckoo, Clamator jacobinus (A)
Common cuckoo, Cuculus canorus

Nightjars and allies
Order: CaprimulgiformesFamily: Caprimulgidae

Nightjars are medium-sized nocturnal birds that usually nest on the ground. They have long wings, short legs and very short bills. Most have small feet, of little use for walking, and long pointed wings. Their soft plumage is camouflaged to resemble bark or leaves.

Red-necked nightjar, Caprimulgus ruficollis
Eurasian nightjar, Caprimulgus europaeus
Egyptian nightjar, Caprimulgus aegyptius

Swifts
Order: CaprimulgiformesFamily: Apodidae

Swifts are small birds which spend the majority of their lives flying. These birds have very short legs and never settle voluntarily on the ground, perching instead only on vertical surfaces. Many swifts have long swept-back wings which resemble a crescent or boomerang.

Alpine swift, Apus melba
Common swift, Apus apus
Pallid swift, Apus pallidus
Little swift, Apus affinis

Rails, gallinules, and coots

Order: GruiformesFamily: Rallidae

Rallidae is a large family of small to medium-sized birds which includes the rails, crakes, coots and gallinules. Typically they inhabit dense vegetation in damp environments near lakes, swamps or rivers. In general they are shy and secretive birds, making them difficult to observe. Most species have strong legs and long toes which are well adapted to soft uneven surfaces. They tend to have short, rounded wings and to be weak fliers.

Water rail, Rallus aquaticus
Corn crake, Crex crex
African crake, Crex egregia (A)
Spotted crake, Porzana porzana
Eurasian moorhen, Gallinula chloropus
Eurasian coot, Fulica atra
Red-knobbed coot, Fulica cristata
Allen's gallinule, Porphyrio alleni (A)
Western swamphen, Porphyrio porphyrio
Striped crake, Aenigmatolimnas marginalis (A)
Little crake, Zapornia parva
Baillon's crake, Zapornia pusilla

Cranes
Order: GruiformesFamily: Gruidae

Cranes are large, long-legged and long-necked birds. Unlike the similar-looking but unrelated herons, cranes fly with necks outstretched, not pulled back. Most have elaborate and noisy courting displays or "dances".

Demoiselle crane, Anthropoides virgo (Ex)
Common crane, Grus grus

Thick-knees
Order: CharadriiformesFamily: Burhinidae

The thick-knees are a group of largely tropical waders in the family Burhinidae. They are found worldwide within the tropical zone, with some species also breeding in temperate Europe and Australia. They are medium to large waders with strong black or yellow-black bills, large yellow eyes and cryptic plumage. Despite being classed as waders, most species have a preference for arid or semi-arid habitats.

Eurasian thick-knee, Burhinus oedicnemus

Stilts and avocets

Order: CharadriiformesFamily: Recurvirostridae

Recurvirostridae is a family of large wading birds, which includes the avocets and stilts. The avocets have long legs and long up-curved bills. The stilts have extremely long legs and long, thin, straight bills.

Black-winged stilt, Himantopus himantopus
Pied avocet, Recurvirostra avosetta

Oystercatchers
Order: CharadriiformesFamily: Haematopodidae

The oystercatchers are large and noisy plover-like birds, with strong bills used for smashing or prising open molluscs.

Eurasian oystercatcher, Haematopus ostralegus

Plovers and lapwings
Order: CharadriiformesFamily: Charadriidae

The family Charadriidae includes the plovers, dotterels and lapwings. They are small to medium-sized birds with compact bodies, short, thick necks and long, usually pointed, wings. They are found in open country worldwide, mostly in habitats near water.

Black-bellied plover, Pluvialis squatarola
European golden-plover, Pluvialis apricaria
Pacific golden-plover, Pluvialis fulva (A)
Northern lapwing, Vanellus vanellus
White-tailed lapwing, Vanellus leucurus
Kentish plover, Charadrius alexandrinus
Common ringed plover, Charadrius hiaticula
Little ringed plover, Charadrius dubius
Eurasian dotterel, Charadrius morinellus

Sandpipers and allies

Order: CharadriiformesFamily: Scolopacidae

Scolopacidae is a large diverse family of small to medium-sized shorebirds including the sandpipers, curlews, godwits, shanks, tattlers, woodcocks, snipes, dowitchers and phalaropes. The majority of these species eat small invertebrates picked out of the mud or soil. Variation in length of legs and bills enables multiple species to feed in the same habitat, particularly on the coast, without direct competition for food.

Whimbrel, Numenius phaeopus
Slender-billed curlew, Numenius tenuirostris
Eurasian curlew, Numenius arquata
Bar-tailed godwit, Limosa lapponica
Black-tailed godwit, Limosa limosa
Ruddy turnstone, Arenaria interpres
Red knot, Calidris canutus
Ruff, Calidris pugnax
Curlew sandpiper, Calidris ferruginea
Temminck's stint, Calidris temminckii
Sanderling, Calidris alba
Dunlin, Calidris alpina
Little stint, Calidris minuta
Pectoral sandpiper, Calidris melanotos (A)
Jack snipe, Lymnocryptes minimus
Eurasian woodcock, Scolopax rusticola
Great snipe, Gallinago media
Common snipe, Gallinago gallinago
Red-necked phalarope, Phalaropus lobatus
Common sandpiper, Actitis hypoleucos
Green sandpiper, Tringa ochropus
Spotted redshank, Tringa erythropus
Common greenshank, Tringa nebularia
Marsh sandpiper, Tringa stagnatilis
Wood sandpiper, Tringa glareola
Common redshank, Tringa totanus

Buttonquails

Order: CharadriiformesFamily: Turnicidae

The buttonquails are small, drab, running birds which resemble the true quails. The female is the brighter of the sexes and initiates courtship. The male incubates the eggs and tends the young.

Small buttonquail, Turnix sylvaticus

Pratincoles and coursers

Order: CharadriiformesFamily: Glareolidae

Glareolidae is a family of wading birds comprising the pratincoles, which have short legs, long pointed wings and long forked tails, and the coursers, which have long legs, short wings and long, pointed bills which curve downwards.

Cream-colored courser, Cursorius cursor
Collared pratincole, Glareola pratincola

Skuas and jaegers
Order: CharadriiformesFamily: Stercorariidae

The family Stercorariidae are, in general, medium to large birds, typically with grey or brown plumage, often with white markings on the wings. They nest on the ground in temperate and arctic regions and are long-distance migrants.

Great skua, Stercorarius skua
Pomarine jaeger, Stercorarius pomarinus (A)
Parasitic jaeger, Stercorarius parasiticus

Auks, murres, and puffins
Order: CharadriiformesFamily: Alcidae

Alcids are superficially similar to penguins due to their black-and-white colours, their upright posture and some of their habits, however they are not related to the penguins and differ in being able to fly. Auks live on the open sea, only deliberately coming ashore to nest.

Common murre, Uria aalge (A)
Razorbill, Alca torda
Atlantic puffin, Fratercula arctica

Gulls, terns, and skimmers

Order: CharadriiformesFamily: Laridae

Laridae is a family of medium to large seabirds, the gulls, terns, and skimmers. Gulls are typically grey or white, often with black markings on the head or wings. They have stout, longish bills and webbed feet. Terns are a group of generally medium to large seabirds typically with grey or white plumage, often with black markings on the head. Most terns hunt fish by diving but some pick insects off the surface of fresh water. Terns are generally long-lived birds, with several species known to live in excess of 30 years.

Black-legged kittiwake, Rissa tridactyla
Sabine's gull, Xema sabini (A)
Slender-billed gull, Chroicocephalus genei
Grey-hooded gull, Chroicocephalus cirrocephalus (A)
Black-headed gull, Chroicocephalus ridibundus
Little gull, Hydrocoloeus minutus
Mediterranean gull, Ichthyaetus melanocephalus
Audouin's gull, Ichthyaetus audouinii
Common gull, Larus canus (A)
Yellow-legged gull, Larus michahellis (A) 
Caspian gull, Larus cachinnans
Lesser black-backed gull, Larus fuscus
Great black-backed gull, Larus marinus
Little tern, Sternula albifrons
Gull-billed tern, Gelochelidon nilotica
Caspian tern, Hydroprogne caspia
Black tern, Chlidonias niger
White-winged tern, Chlidonias leucopterus
Whiskered tern, Chlidonias hybrida
Roseate tern, Sterna dougallii
Common tern, Sterna hirundo
Arctic tern, Sterna paradisaea
Sandwich tern, Thalasseus sandvicensis
Lesser crested tern, Thalasseus bengalensis

Loons

Order: GaviiformesFamily: Gaviidae

Loons, known as divers in Europe, are a group of aquatic birds found in many parts of North America and northern Europe. They are the size of a large duck or small goose, which they somewhat resemble when swimming, but to which they are completely unrelated.

Red-throated loon, Gavia stellata (A)
Arctic loon, Gavia arctica
Common loon, Gavia immer

Southern storm-petrels

Order: ProcellariiformesFamily: Oceanitidae

The austral storm petrels are relatives of the petrels and are the smallest seabirds. They feed on planktonic crustaceans and small fish picked from the surface, typically while hovering.

Wilson's storm-petrel, Oceanites oceanicus

Northern storm-petrels

Order: ProcellariiformesFamily: Hydrobatidae

Though the members of this family are similar in many respects to the southern storm-petrels, including their general appearance and habits, there are enough genetic differences to warrant their placement in a separate family.

European storm-petrel, Hydrobates pelagicus (A)
Leach's storm-petrel, Hydrobates leucorhous

Shearwaters and petrels

Order: ProcellariiformesFamily: Procellariidae

The procellariids are the main group of medium-sized "true petrels", characterised by united nostrils with medium septum and a long outer functional primary.

Cory's shearwater, Calonectris diomedea
Great shearwater, Ardenna gravis
Sooty shearwater, Ardenna griseus
Yelkouan shearwater, Puffinus yelkouan
Balearic shearwater, Puffinus mauretanicus

Storks

Order: CiconiiformesFamily: Ciconiidae

Storks are large, long-legged, long-necked, wading birds with long, stout bills. Storks are mute, but bill-clattering is an important mode of communication at the nest. Their nests can be large and may be reused for many years. Many species are migratory.

Black stork, Ciconia nigra
White stork, Ciconia ciconia
Yellow-billed stork, Mycteria ibis

Boobies and gannets

Order: SuliformesFamily: Sulidae

The sulids comprise the gannets and boobies. Both groups are medium to large coastal seabirds that plunge-dive for fish.

Northern gannet, Morus bassanus

Cormorants and shags

Order: SuliformesFamily: Phalacrocoracidae

Phalacrocoracidae is a family of medium to large coastal, fish-eating seabirds that includes cormorants and shags. Plumage colouration varies, with the majority having mainly dark plumage, some species being black-and-white and a few being colourful.

Pygmy cormorant, Microcarbo pygmeus
Great cormorant, Phalacrocorax carbo
European shag, Gulosus aristotelis

Pelicans

Order: PelecaniformesFamily: Pelecanidae

Pelicans are large water birds with a distinctive pouch under their beak. As with other members of the order Pelecaniformes, they have webbed feet with four toes.

Great white pelican, Pelecanus onocrotalus
Dalmatian pelican, Pelecanus crispus

Herons, egrets, and bitterns

Order: PelecaniformesFamily: Ardeidae

The family Ardeidae contains the bitterns, herons and egrets. Herons and egrets are medium to large wading birds with long necks and legs. Bitterns tend to be shorter necked and more wary. Members of Ardeidae fly with their necks retracted, unlike other long-necked birds such as storks, ibises and spoonbills.

Great bittern, Botaurus stellaris
Little bittern, Ixobrychus minutus
Gray heron, Ardea cinerea
Black-headed heron, Ardea melanocephala (A)
Purple heron, Ardea purpurea
Great egret, Ardea alba
Little egret, Egretta garzetta
Western reef-heron, Egretta gularis (A)
Cattle egret, Bubulcus ibis
Squacco heron, Ardeola ralloides
Black-crowned night-heron, Nycticorax nycticorax

Ibises and spoonbills

Order: PelecaniformesFamily: Threskiornithidae

Threskiornithidae is a family of large terrestrial and wading birds which includes the ibises and spoonbills. They have long, broad wings with 11 primary and about 20 secondary feathers. They are strong fliers and despite their size and weight, very capable soarers.

Glossy ibis, Plegadis falcinellus 
Northern bald ibis, Geronticus eremita (Ex)
Eurasian spoonbill, Platalea leucorodia

Osprey
Order: AccipitriformesFamily: Pandionidae

The family Pandionidae contains only one species, the osprey. The osprey is a medium-large raptor which is a specialist fish-eater with a worldwide distribution.

Osprey, Pandion haliaetus

Hawks, eagles, and kites 

Order: AccipitriformesFamily: Accipitridae

Accipitridae is a family of birds of prey, which includes hawks, eagles, kites, harriers and Old World vultures. These birds have powerful hooked beaks for tearing flesh from their prey, strong legs, powerful talons and keen eyesight.

Black-winged kite, Elanus caeruleus
Bearded vulture, Gypaetus barbatus
Egyptian vulture, Neophron percnopterus
European honey-buzzard, Pernis apivorus
Cinereous vulture, Aegypius monachus (A)
Lappet-faced vulture, Torgos tracheliotos
Eurasian griffon, Gyps fulvus
Short-toed snake eagle, Circaetus gallicus
Lesser spotted eagle, Clanga pomarina
Greater spotted eagle, Clanga clanga (A)
Booted eagle, Hieraaetus pennatus
Tawny eagle, Aquila rapax
Spanish eagle, Aquila adalberti (Ex)
Imperial eagle, Aquila heliaca
Golden eagle, Aquila chrysaetos
Verreaux's eagle, Aquila verreauxii (A)
Bonelli's eagle, Aquila fasciata
Eurasian marsh-harrier, Circus aeruginosus
Hen harrier, Circus cyaneus
Pallid harrier, Circus macrourus
Montagu's harrier, Circus pygargus
Eurasian sparrowhawk, Accipiter nisus
Northern goshawk, Accipiter gentilis
Red kite, Milvus milvus
Black kite, Milvus migrans
White-tailed eagle, Haliaeetus albicilla (A)(Ex)
Common buzzard, Buteo buteo
Long-legged buzzard, Buteo rufinus

Barn-owls
Order: StrigiformesFamily: Tytonidae

Barn-owls are medium to large owls with large heads and characteristic heart-shaped faces. They have long strong legs with powerful talons.

Barn owl, Tyto alba

Owls

Order: StrigiformesFamily: Strigidae

The typical owls are small to large solitary nocturnal birds of prey. They have large forward-facing eyes and ears, a hawk-like beak and a conspicuous circle of feathers around each eye called a facial disk.

Eurasian scops-owl, Otus scops
Eurasian eagle-owl, Bubo bubo
Pharaoh eagle-owl, Bubo ascalaphus
Little owl, Athene noctua
Tawny owl, Strix aluco (A)
Maghreb owl, Strix mauritanica
Long-eared owl, Asio otus
Short-eared owl, Asio flammeus
Marsh owl, Asio capensis (Ex)

Mousebirds
Order: ColiiformesFamily: Coliidae

The mousebirds are slender grayish or brown birds with soft, hairlike body feathers and very long thin tails. They are arboreal and scurry through the leaves like rodents in search of berries, fruit, and buds. They are acrobatic and can feed upside down. All species have strong claws and reversible outer toes. They also have crests and stubby bills.

Blue-naped mousebird, Urocolius macrourus (A)

Hoopoes
Order: BucerotiformesFamily: Upupidae

Hoopoes have black, white and orangey-pink colouring with a large erectile crest on their head.

Eurasian hoopoe, Upupa epops

Kingfishers
Order: CoraciiformesFamily: Alcedinidae

Kingfishers are medium-sized birds with large heads, long, pointed bills, short legs and stubby tails.

Common kingfisher, Alcedo atthis

Bee-eaters

Order: CoraciiformesFamily: Meropidae

The bee-eaters are a group of near passerine birds in the family Meropidae. Most species are found in Africa but others occur in southern Europe, Madagascar, Australia and New Guinea. They are characterised by richly coloured plumage, slender bodies and usually elongated central tail feathers. All are colourful and have long downturned bills and pointed wings, which give them a swallow-like appearance when seen from afar.

White-throated bee-eater, Merops albicollis (A)
Blue-cheeked bee-eater, Merops persicus
European bee-eater, Merops apiaster

Rollers
Order: CoraciiformesFamily: Coraciidae

Rollers resemble crows in size and build, but are more closely related to the kingfishers and bee-eaters. They share the colourful appearance of those groups with blues and browns predominating. The two inner front toes are connected, but the outer toe is not.

European roller, Coracias garrulus

Woodpeckers

Order: PiciformesFamily: Picidae

Woodpeckers are small to medium-sized birds with chisel-like beaks, short legs, stiff tails and long tongues used for capturing insects. Some species have feet with two toes pointing forward and two backward, while several species have only three toes. Many woodpeckers have the habit of tapping noisily on tree trunks with their beaks.

Eurasian wryneck, Jynx torquilla
Great spotted woodpecker, Dendrocopos major
Lesser spotted woodpecker, Dryobates minor
Levaillant's woodpecker, Picus vaillantii

Falcons and caracaras

Order: FalconiformesFamily: Falconidae

Falconidae is a family of diurnal birds of prey. They differ from hawks, eagles and kites in that they kill with their beaks instead of their talons.

Lesser kestrel, Falco naumanni
Eurasian kestrel, Falco tinnunculus
Red-footed falcon, Falco vespertinus (A)
Eleonora's falcon, Falco eleonorae
Sooty falcon, Falco concolor (A)
Merlin, Falco columbarius
Eurasian hobby, Falco subbuteo
Lanner falcon, Falco biarmicus
Peregrine falcon, Falco peregrinus
Barbary falcon, Falco peregrinus pelegrinoides

Old World parrots
Order: PsittaciformesFamily: Psittaculidae

Characteristic features of parrots include a strong curved bill, an upright stance, strong legs, and clawed zygodactyl feet. Many parrots are vividly colored, and some are multi-colored. Old World parrots are found from Africa east across south and southeast Asia and Oceania to Australia and New Zealand.

Rose-ringed parakeet, Psittacula krameri (I)

African and New World parrots
Order: PsittaciformesFamily: Psittacidae

Most of the more than 150 species in this family are found in the New World.

Dusky parrot, Pionus fuscus (A)

Old World orioles
Order: PasseriformesFamily: Oriolidae

The Old World orioles are colourful passerine birds. They are not related to the New World orioles.

Eurasian golden oriole, Oriolus oriolus

Bushshrikes and allies

Order: PasseriformesFamily: Malaconotidae

Bushshrikes are similar in habits to shrikes, hunting insects and other small prey from a perch on a bush. Although similar in build to the shrikes, these tend to be either colourful species or largely black; some species are quite secretive.

Black-crowned tchagra, Tchagra senegalus

Shrikes

Order: PasseriformesFamily: Laniidae

Shrikes are passerine birds known for their habit of catching other birds and small animals and impaling the uneaten portions of their bodies on thorns. A typical shrike's beak is hooked, like a bird of prey.

Red-backed shrike, Lanius collurio (A)
Red-tailed shrike, Lanius phoenicuroides
Great gray shrike, Lanius excubitor
Masked shrike, Lanius nubicus (A)
Woodchat shrike, Lanius senator

Crows, jays, and magpies

Order: PasseriformesFamily: Corvidae

The family Corvidae includes crows, ravens, jays, choughs, magpies, treepies, nutcrackers and ground jays. Corvids are above average in size among the Passeriformes, and some of the larger species show high levels of intelligence.

Eurasian jay, Garrulus glandarius
Maghreb magpie, Pica mauritanica
Eurasian magpie, Pica pica
Red-billed chough, Pyrrhocorax pyrrhocorax
Eurasian jackdaw, Corvus monedula
Rook, Corvus frugilegus (A)
Carrion crow, Corvus corone
Pied crow, Corvus albus (A)
Brown-necked raven, Corvus ruficollis
Common raven, Corvus corax

Tits, chickadees, and titmice
Order: PasseriformesFamily: Paridae

The Paridae are mainly small stocky woodland species with short stout bills. Some have crests. They are adaptable birds, with a mixed diet including seeds and insects.

Coal tit, Periparus ater
African blue tit, Cyanistes teneriffae
Great tit, Parus major

Penduline-tits
Order: PasseriformesFamily: Remizidae

The penduline-tits are a group of small passerine birds related to the true tits. They are insectivores.

Eurasian penduline-tit, Remiz pendulinus (A)

Larks

Order: PasseriformesFamily: Alaudidae

Larks are small terrestrial birds with often extravagant songs and display flights. Most larks are fairly dull in appearance. Their food is insects and seeds.

Greater hoopoe-lark, Alaemon alaudipes
Thick-billed lark, Ramphocoris clotbey
Bar-tailed lark, Ammomanes cincturus
Desert lark, Ammomanes deserti
Black-crowned sparrow-lark, Eremopterix nigriceps (A)
Horned lark, Eremophila alpestris (A)
Temminck's lark, Eremophila bilopha
Greater short-toed lark, Calandrella brachydactyla
Calandra lark, Melanocorypha calandra
Dupont's lark, Chersophilus duponti
Dunn's lark, Eremalauda dunni (A)
Mediterranean short-toed lark, Alaudala rufescens
Wood lark, Lullula arborea
Eurasian skylark, Alauda arvensis
Thekla's lark, Galerida theklae
Crested lark, Galerida cristata

Bearded reedling
Order: PasseriformesFamily: Panuridae

This species, the only one in its family, is found in reed beds throughout temperate Europe and Asia.

Bearded reedling, Panurus biarmicus

Cisticolas and allies
Order: PasseriformesFamily: Cisticolidae

The Cisticolidae are warblers found mainly in warmer southern regions of the Old World. They are generally very small birds of drab brown or grey appearance found in open country such as grassland or scrub.

Zitting cisticola, Cisticola juncidis

Reed warblers and allies
Order: PasseriformesFamily: Acrocephalidae

The members of this family are usually rather large for "warblers". Most are rather plain olivaceous brown above with much yellow to beige below. They are usually found in open woodland, reedbeds, or tall grass. The family occurs mostly in southern to western Eurasia and surroundings, but it also ranges far into the Pacific, with some species in Africa.

Eastern olivaceous warbler, Iduna pallida
Western olivaceous warbler, Iduna opaca
Olive-tree warbler, Hippolais olivetorum
Melodious warbler, Hippolais polyglotta
Icterine warbler, Hippolais icterina
Aquatic warbler, Acrocephalus paludicola
Moustached warbler, Acrocephalus melanopogon
Sedge warbler, Acrocephalus schoenobaenus
Marsh warbler, Acrocephalus palustris
Common reed warbler, Acrocephalus scirpaceus
Great reed warbler, Acrocephalus arundinaceus

Grassbirds and allies
Order: PasseriformesFamily: Locustellidae

Locustellidae are a family of small insectivorous songbirds found mainly in Eurasia, Africa, and the Australian region. They are smallish birds with tails that are usually long and pointed, and tend to be drab brownish or buffy all over.

River warbler, Locustella fluviatilis
Savi's warbler, Locustella luscinioides
Common grasshopper-warbler, Locustella naevia

Swallows
Order: PasseriformesFamily: Hirundinidae

The family Hirundinidae is adapted to aerial feeding. They have a slender streamlined body, long pointed wings and a short bill with a wide gape. The feet are adapted to perching rather than walking, and the front toes are partially joined at the base.

Plain martin, Riparia paludicola (A)
Bank swallow, Riparia riparia
Eurasian crag-martin, Ptyonoprogne rupestris
Rock martin, Ptyonoprogne fuligula
Barn swallow, Hirundo rustica
Red-rumped swallow, Cecropis daurica
Common house-martin, Delichon urbicum

Bulbuls
Order: PasseriformesFamily: Pycnonotidae

Bulbuls are medium-sized songbirds. Some are colourful with yellow, red or orange vents, cheeks, throats or supercilia, but most are drab, with uniform olive-brown to black plumage. Some species have distinct crests.

Common bulbul, Pycnonotus barbatus

Leaf warblers

Order: PasseriformesFamily: Phylloscopidae

Leaf warblers are a family of small insectivorous birds found mostly in Eurasia and ranging into Wallacea and Africa. The species are of various sizes, often green-plumaged above and yellow below, or more subdued with grayish-green to grayish-brown colors.

Wood warbler, Phylloscopus sibilatrix
Western Bonelli's warbler, Phylloscopus bonelli
Yellow-browed warbler, Phylloscopus inornatus (A)
Willow warbler, Phylloscopus trochilus
Common chiffchaff, Phylloscopus collybita
Iberian chiffchaff, Phylloscopus ibericus

Bush warblers and allies
Order: PasseriformesFamily: Scotocercidae

The members of this family are found throughout Africa, Asia, and Polynesia. Their taxonomy is in flux, and some authorities place some genera in other families.

Scrub warbler, Scotocerca inquieta
Cetti's warbler, Cettia cetti

Sylviid warblers, parrotbills, and allies

Order: PasseriformesFamily: Sylviidae

The family Sylviidae is a group of small insectivorous passerine birds. They mainly occur as breeding species, as the common name implies, in Europe, Asia and, to a lesser extent, Africa.

Eurasian blackcap, Sylvia atricapilla
Garden warbler, Sylvia borin
Lesser whitethroat, Curruca curruca
Western Orphean warbler, Curruca hortensis
African desert warbler, Curruca deserti
Tristram's warbler, Curruca deserticola
Rüppell's warbler, Curruca ruppeli (A)
Sardinian warbler, Curruca melanocephala
Moltoni's warbler, Curruca subalpina (A)
Western subalpine warbler, Curruca iberiae
Eastern subalpine warbler, Curruca cantillans
Greater whitethroat, Curruca communis
Spectacled warbler, Curruca conspicillata
Marmora's warbler, Curruca sarda
Dartford warbler, Curruca undata

Laughingthrushes and allies
Order: PasseriformesFamily: Leiothrichidae

The members of this family are diverse in size and colouration, though those of genus Turdoides tend to be brown or greyish. The family is found in Africa, India, and southeast Asia.

Fulvous chatterer, Argya fulva

Kinglets

Order: PasseriformesFamily: Regulidae

The kinglets, also called crests, are a small group of birds often included in the Old World warblers, but frequently given family status because they also resemble the titmice.

Goldcrest, Regulus regulus
Common firecrest, Regulus ignicapillus

Wallcreeper
Order: PasseriformesFamily: Tichodromidae

The wallcreeper is a small bird related to the nuthatch family, which has stunning crimson, grey and black plumage.

Wallcreeper, Tichodroma muraria (A)

Nuthatches

Order: PasseriformesFamily: Sittidae

Nuthatches are small woodland birds. They have the unusual ability to climb down trees head first, unlike other birds which can only go upwards. Nuthatches have big heads, short tails and powerful bills and feet.

Algerian nuthatch, Sitta ledanti (E)

Treecreepers

Order: PasseriformesFamily: Certhiidae

Treecreepers are small woodland birds, brown above and white below. They have thin pointed down-curved bills, which they use to extricate insects from bark. They have stiff tail feathers, like woodpeckers, which they use to support themselves on vertical trees.

Short-toed treecreeper, Certhia brachydactyla

Wrens
Order: PasseriformesFamily: Troglodytidae

The wrens are mainly small and inconspicuous except for their loud songs. These birds have short wings and thin down-turned bills. Several species often hold their tails upright. All are insectivorous.

Eurasian wren, Troglodytes troglodytes

Dippers
Order: PasseriformesFamily: Cinclidae

Dippers are a group of perching birds whose habitat includes aquatic environments in the Americas, Europe and Asia. They are named for their bobbing or dipping movements.

White-throated dipper, Cinclus cinclus

Starlings
Order: PasseriformesFamily: Sturnidae

Starlings are small to medium-sized passerine birds. Their flight is strong and direct and they are very gregarious. Their preferred habitat is fairly open country. They eat insects and fruit. Plumage is typically dark with a metallic sheen.

European starling, Sturnus vulgaris
Spotless starling, Sturnus unicolor
Rosy starling, Pastor roseus

Thrushes and allies

Order: PasseriformesFamily: Turdidae

The thrushes are a group of passerine birds that occur mainly in the Old World. They are plump, soft plumaged, small to medium-sized insectivores or sometimes omnivores, often feeding on the ground. Many have attractive songs.

Mistle thrush, Turdus viscivorus
Song thrush, Turdus philomelos
Redwing, Turdus iliacus
Eurasian blackbird, Turdus merula
Fieldfare, Turdus pilaris (A)
Ring ouzel, Turdus torquatus

Old World flycatchers

Order: PasseriformesFamily: Muscicapidae

Old World flycatchers are a large group of small passerine birds native to the Old World. They are mainly small arboreal insectivores. The appearance of these birds is highly varied, but they mostly have weak songs and harsh calls.

Spotted flycatcher, Muscicapa striata
Black scrub-robin, Cercotrichas podobe (A)
Rufous-tailed scrub-robin, Cercotrichas galactotes
European robin, Erithacus rubecula
Common nightingale, Luscinia megarhynchos
Bluethroat, Luscinia svecica
Red-breasted flycatcher, Ficedula parva
European pied flycatcher, Ficedula hypoleuca
Atlas flycatcher, Ficedula speculigera
Collared flycatcher, Ficedula albicollis
Moussier's redstart, Phoenicurus moussieri
Common redstart, Phoenicurus phoenicurus
Black redstart, Phoenicurus ochruros
Rufous-tailed rock-thrush, Monticola saxatilis
Blue rock-thrush, Monticola solitarius
Whinchat, Saxicola rubetra
European stonechat, Saxicola rubicola
Northern wheatear, Oenanthe oenanthe
Atlas wheatear, Oenanthe seebohmi
Isabelline wheatear, Oenanthe isabellina
Desert wheatear, Oenanthe deserti
Western black-eared wheatear, Oenanthe hispanica
Eastern black-eared wheatear, Oenanthe melanoleuca
Red-rumped wheatear, Oenanthe moesta
Black wheatear, Oenanthe leucura
White-crowned wheatear, Oenanthe leucopyga
Mourning wheatear, Oenanthe lugens

Waxwings
Order: PasseriformesFamily: Bombycillidae

The waxwings are a group of passerine birds with soft silky plumage and unique red tips to some of the wing feathers. In the Bohemian and cedar waxwings, these tips look like sealing wax and give the group its name. These are arboreal birds of northern forests. They live on insects in summer and berries in winter.

Bohemian waxwing, Bombycilla garrulus

Waxbills and allies

Order: PasseriformesFamily: Estrildidae

The estrildid finches are small passerine birds of the Old World tropics and Australasia. They are gregarious and often colonial seed eaters with short thick but pointed bills. They are all similar in structure and habits, but have wide variation in plumage colours and patterns.

African silverbill, Euodice cantans (A)
Indian silverbill, Euodice malabarica (I)
Cut-throat, Amadina fasciata (A)
Red-billed firefinch, Lagonosticta senegala

Accentors
Order: PasseriformesFamily: Prunellidae

The accentors are in the only bird family, Prunellidae, which is completely endemic to the Palearctic. They are small, fairly drab species superficially similar to sparrows.

Alpine accentor, Prunella collaris
Dunnock, Prunella modularis

Old World sparrows

Order: PasseriformesFamily: Passeridae

Old World sparrows are small passerine birds. In general, sparrows tend to be small, plump, brown or grey birds with short tails and short powerful beaks. Old World sparrow are seed eaters, but they also consume small insects.

House sparrow, Passer domesticus
Italian sparrow, Passer domesticus (A)
Spanish sparrow, Passer hispaniolensis
Desert sparrow, Passer simplex
Eurasian tree sparrow, Passer montanus (A)
Sudan golden sparrow, Passer luteus
Rock sparrow, Petronia petronia

Wagtails and pipits

Order: PasseriformesFamily: Motacillidae

Motacillidae is a family of small passerine birds with medium to long tails. They include the wagtails, longclaws and pipits. They are slender, ground feeding insectivores of open country.

Gray wagtail, Motacilla cinerea
Western yellow wagtail, Motacilla flava
White wagtail, Motacilla alba
Richard's pipit, Anthus richardi
Tawny pipit, Anthus campestris
Meadow pipit, Anthus pratensis
Tree pipit, Anthus trivialis
Red-throated pipit, Anthus cervinus
Water pipit, Anthus spinoletta
Rock pipit, Anthus petrosus

Finches, euphonias, and allies

Order: PasseriformesFamily: Fringillidae

Finches are seed-eating passerine birds, that are small to moderately large and have a strong beak, usually conical and in some species very large. All have twelve tail feathers and nine primaries. These birds have a bouncing flight with alternating bouts of flapping and gliding on closed wings, and most sing well.

Common chaffinch, Fringilla coelebs
Brambling, Fringilla montifringilla
Hawfinch, Coccothraustes coccothraustes
Eurasian bullfinch, Pyrrhula pyrrhula
Crimson-winged finch, Rhodopechys sanguinea
Trumpeter finch, Bucanetes githaginea
European greenfinch, Chloris chloris
Eurasian linnet, Linaria cannabina
Red crossbill, Loxia curvirostra
European goldfinch, Carduelis carduelis
Citril finch, Carduelis citrinella (A)
European serin, Serinus serinus
Eurasian siskin, Spinus spinus

Longspurs and snow buntings

Order: PasseriformesFamily: Calcariidae

The Calcariidae are a group of passerine birds which had been traditionally grouped with the New World sparrows, but differ in a number of respects and are usually found in open grassy areas.

Lapland longspur, Calcarius lapponicus (A)
Snow bunting, Plectrophenax nivalis (A)

Old World buntings
Order: PasseriformesFamily: Emberizidae

The emberizids are a large family of passerine birds. They are seed-eating birds with distinctively shaped bills. In Europe, most species are called buntings. Many emberizid species have distinctive head patterns.

Black-headed bunting, Emberiza melanocephala (A)
Corn bunting, Emberiza calandra
Rock bunting, Emberiza cia
Cirl bunting, Emberiza cirlus
Yellowhammer, Emberiza citrinella (A)
Ortolan bunting, Emberiza hortulana
Cretzschmar's bunting, Emberiza caesia
House bunting, Emberiza sahari
Striolated bunting, Emberiza striolata
Reed bunting, Emberiza schoeniclus
Little bunting, Emberiza pusilla (A)
Rustic bunting, Emberiza pusilla (A)

See also
List of birds
Lists of birds by region

References

External links
 Avibase, website by country with standardised codes for abundance and seasonal presence

Algeria
Birds
 
Algeria